Péter Sárfalvi (born 31 July 1970) is a Hungarian modern pentathlete. He competed at the 1996 Summer Olympics and the 2000 Summer Olympics.

References

1970 births
Living people
Hungarian male modern pentathletes
Olympic modern pentathletes of Hungary
Modern pentathletes at the 1996 Summer Olympics
Modern pentathletes at the 2000 Summer Olympics
Sportspeople from Budapest